Ahmed Ali (born 15 October 1972) is a Ghanaian sprinter. He competed in the men's 4 × 400 metres relay at the 1996 Summer Olympics.

References

External links

1972 births
Living people
Athletes (track and field) at the 1996 Summer Olympics
Ghanaian male sprinters
Olympic athletes of Ghana
Place of birth missing (living people)
African Games medalists in athletics (track and field)
African Games gold medalists for Ghana
Athletes (track and field) at the 1995 All-Africa Games